The 2000 EHF European Women's Handball Championship was held in Romania from 8 to 17 December. It was won by Hungary by beating Ukraine 32–30 after extra time in the final match.

Venues
The teams of the tournament were divided into two groups. The matches of Group A took place in the city of Râmnicu Vâlcea, while Group B games and the final round were played in the capital city, Bucharest.

Qualification

Note: Bold indicates champion for that year. Italic indicates host for that year.

Squads

Preliminary round

Group A

Group B

Final round

Bracket

Eleventh place game

Ninth place game

Seventh place game

Fifth place game

Semifinals

Third place game

Final

Final ranking and statistics

Top goalscorers

Source: EHF

Top goalkeepers

Source: EHF

All Star Team

Source: Hand mag

2000
Handball
2000
Women's handball in Romania
European Women's Handball Championship
December 2000 sports events in Europe